André Pelletier (28 April 1898 – 28 August 1952) was a Canadian politician and a two-term Member of the Legislative Assembly of Quebec.

Background

He was born in Saint-Louis-du-Ha! Ha!, Bas-Saint-Laurent and became an insurance agent. He served as School Board President of Saint-Louis-du-Ha! Ha! from 1937 to 1944.

He ran as a Union Nationale candidate in the 1944 election in the provincial district of Témiscouata and won against Liberal incumbent Joseph-Alphonse Beaulieu.  He was re-elected in the 1948 election, but he did not run for re-election in the 1952 election.

Pelletier died on August 28, 1952, in Rivière-du-Loup.

References

1898 births
1952 deaths
Union Nationale (Quebec) MNAs
People from Bas-Saint-Laurent